The Octoroon is a 1909 American silent film produced by Kalem Company and directed by Sidney Olcott, shot in Florida.

Production notes
The film was shot in Jacksonville, Florida.

Other title : A Story of the Turpentine Forest

Bibliography

 The Moving Picture World vol 4 n°1, p 11; p 533. 
 The New York Dramatic Mirror, 1909, January 9, p 9; January 16, p 7.

References

External links
 AFI Catalog

1909 films
1909 drama films
1909 short films
American black-and-white films
American silent short films
Films directed by Sidney Olcott
Films set in Florida
Films shot in Jacksonville, Florida
Silent American drama films
1900s English-language films
1900s American films
American drama short films